William Chalmers (3 April 1901 – 28 Dec 1989) was a Scottish footballer who played as an outside forward.

References

External links
 LFC History profile

1901 births
1997 deaths
Date of death missing 
Scottish footballers
Liverpool F.C. players
Footballers from Aberdeen
Tranmere Rovers F.C. players
St Johnstone F.C. players
Association football outside forwards
Scottish Football League players
English Football League players